The Greater London Built-up Area, or Greater London Urban Area, is a conurbation in south-east England that constitutes the continuous urban sprawl of London, and includes surrounding adjacent urban towns as defined by the Office for National Statistics. It is the largest urban area in the United Kingdom with a population of 9,787,426 in 2011.

Overview

It includes most of the London region – omitting most of its woodland; small, buffered districts; the Lee Valley Park; and the two largest sewage treatment works serving London by the River Thames. Outside the region's administrative boundary, it includes contiguous suburban settlements and a few densely populated outliers connected to it by ribbon development. Its outer boundary is constrained by the Metropolitan Green Belt and it is therefore much smaller than the wider metropolitan area of London.

The built-up area of the Greater London region continues beyond the region's administrative boundary in some places, while stopping short of it in others. For this reason, the density of the Greater London Built-Up Area is 8.3% higher than that of Greater London, the figure for which includes these outlying rural areas (notably in Hillingdon, Enfield, Havering and Bromley). All of both areas are drained ultimately by the River Thames. The area uses around 4 gigawatts of electricity power.

History
The density gradient of industrialising cities has tended to follow a specific pattern: the density of the centre of the city would rise during urbanisation and the population would remain heavily concentrated in the city centre with a rapid decline in settlement towards the periphery. Then, with continued economic growth and the expanding networks of public transport, people (particularly the middle-class) would then slowly migrate towards the suburbs, gradually softening the population density gradient. This point was generally reached when the city reached a certain stage of economic development. In London, this point was reached in the first half of the nineteenth century, in Paris toward the end of the century and in New York City at the turn of the twentieth.

However, London had been sprawling out of its medieval confines within the City since the eighteenth century, when the city experienced its first great urban surge. Areas to the west of Westminster were increasingly built up for the wealthy, to live in the suburbs of the city.

A dramatic increase in the city's urban sprawl began in the nineteenth century when labourers flocked from the countryside to work in the new factories that were then springing up. Large developments of small terraced houses began to appear and the new public transport systems – (the Tube, buses and trams) – allowed workers to commute into the city daily. Suburban districts also sprung up around the city centre to accommodate those who wanted to escape the squalid conditions of the industrial town.

By the mid-nineteenth century, the first major suburban areas were springing up around London as the city (then the largest in the world) became more overcrowded and unsanitary. A major catalyst in the growth in urban sprawl came from the opening of the Metropolitan Railway in the 1860s. The line joined the capital's financial heart in the City to what were to become the suburbs of Middlesex.

Unlike other railway companies, which were required to dispose of surplus land, the Met was allowed to retain such land that it believed was necessary for future railway use. Initially, the surplus land was managed by the Land Committee, and, from the 1880s, the land was developed and sold to domestic buyers in places like Willesden Park Estate, Cecil Park, near Pinner and at Wembley Park. In 1919, with the expectation of a post-war housing boom, Metropolitan Railway Country Estates Limited was formed and went on to develop estates at Kingsbury Garden Village near Neasden, Wembley Park, Cecil Park and Grange Estate at Pinner and the Cedars Estate at Rickmansworth and create places such as Harrow Garden Village.

By the early twentieth century, amid increasing middle-class affluence, large low-density suburbs of semi-detached houses had sprung up all around the city, doubling the area of built-up London in the interwar period alone, despite the population increase is just 10%. H.G Wells even predicted in 1902 that within a hundred years most of southern England would have been subsumed into one gigantic conurbation centred in London.

2011 Census subdivisions
At the time of the 2011 Census, the Office for National Statistics defined the Greater London Urban Area as being made up of the following components:

London region
The London region consists of 33 districts: the City of London, the 12 Inner London boroughs (including the City of Westminster), and the 20 Outer London boroughs.

 Barking and Dagenham
 Barnet
 Bexley
 Brent
 Bromley
 Camden
 City of London
 City of Westminster
 Croydon
 Ealing
 Enfield
 Greenwich
 Hackney
 Hammersmith and Fulham
 Haringey
 Harrow
 Havering
 Hillingdon
 Hounslow
 Islington
 Kensington and Chelsea
 Kingston upon Thames
 Lambeth
 Lewisham
 Merton
 Newham
 Redbridge
 Richmond upon Thames
 Southwark
 Sutton
 Tower Hamlets
 Waltham Forest
 Wandsworth

Surrey

 Addlestone
 Ashford
 Ashtead
 Banstead
 Bramley
 Brookwood
 Broomhall/Windlesham/Virginia Water
 Caterham
 Chertsey
 Chobham
 Claygate
 Cobham
 Effingham
 Egham
 Epsom
 Esher
 Ewell
 Guildford
 Hooley
 Leatherhead
 Lyne
 Mimbridge
 Netherne-on-the-Hill
 Ottershaw
 Pirbright
 Pirbright Camp
 Shepperton
 Staines-upon-Thames
 Sunbury
 Walton-on-Thames
 Warlingham
 Weybridge
 Woking
 Worplesdon

Hertfordshire

 Bedmond
 Borehamwood
 Bushey
 Cheshunt
 Chorleywood
 Elstree
 Hemel Hempstead
 Hoddesdon
 How Wood

 Northwood
 Park Street
 Rickmansworth
 Sawbridgeworth
 Smallford
 St Albans
 St Margarets
 Waltham Cross
 Watford

Berkshire
 Binfield
 Bracknell
 Cheapside
 North Ascot
 Winkfield Street
 Woodside
 Wraysbury

Essex
 Broadley Common
 Chigwell
 Harlow
 Loughton
 Stapleford Abbotts
 Waltham Abbey

Kent
 Dartford
 Gravesend
 Greenhithe
 Maypole
 Northfleet
 Stone
 Swanscombe

Omitted areas
In the 2011 census, the following areas were considered to be built-up areas but outside the Greater London Built-up Area, despite being within Greater London. All of these areas had populations of less than a thousand except New Addington BUA and Harefield BUA which had populations of 22,280 and 6,573 respectively. Note that these are  Built-up areas as defined by Office for National Statistics and will have different boundaries from the settlements after which they are named.

Berry's Green
Crews Hill
Cudham
Downe
Harefield
Hazelwood
New Addington 
Royal National Orthopaedic Hospital

2001 Census subdivisions
At the time of the 2001 Census, the Office for National Statistics defined the Greater London Urban Area as being made up of the following components:

London region
Within the region, there were 33 components corresponding to the City of London and the London boroughs. However, the ONS boundaries are not identical to the local authority boundaries, and outlying areas such as Biggin Hill in Bromley are omitted.

 Barking and Dagenham
 Barnet
 Bexley
 Brent
 Bromley
 Camden
 Croydon
 Ealing
 Enfield
 Greenwich
 Hackney
 Hammersmith and Fulham
 Haringey
 Harrow
 Havering
 Hillingdon
 Hounslow
 Islington
 Kensington and Chelsea
 Kingston upon Thames
 Lambeth
 Lewisham
 City of London
 Merton
 Newham
 Redbridge
 Richmond upon Thames
 Southwark
 Sutton
 Tower Hamlets
 Waltham Forest
 Wandsworth
 Westminster

Outside Greater London

South East England
Addlestone
Banstead / Tadworth
Caterham and Warlingham
Chertsey
Dartford
Egham
Epsom and Ewell
Esher / Molesey
Gravesend
Leatherhead
Northfleet
Ottershaw
Shepperton
Staines-upon-Thames
Sunbury
Sunningdale / Ascot
Swanscombe
Virginia Water
Walton and Weybridge
 West End
Windlesham
Woking / Byfleet

East of England
Bushey
Cheshunt
Chigwell
Chorleywood
Hemel Hempstead
Hoddesdon
Kings Langley
Loughton
Rickmansworth
St Albans
South Oxhey
Waltham Abbey
Watford

See also

List of urban areas in the United Kingdom
London metropolitan area

Notes

References

Greater London
Geography of London
Urban areas of England
South East England